Mdzimba is a mountain and hill range in northwestern Eswatini. Mount Mdimba flanks the eastern side of the Ezulwini Valley. This valley is the residence of the Swazi royal family and is shrouded in legends and mysteries. The Mdzimba hills historically have had strategical importance and contain many caves in which locals would hide during raids.The mountain is named after a tribe who lived in the mountains led by a chief by the name of “Dzimba”. It is said that as a token of gratitude, the then King Sobhuza married the Chief’s first daughter. In 1826, the Swazi people retreated into the hills during an attack by the Zulus.  The Boers met with the locals of Mdzimba on 16 December 1889.

References

Mountains of Eswatini
History of Eswatini